Cereopsius satelles is a species of beetle in the family Cerambycidae. It was described by Francis Polkinghorne Pascoe in 1885. It is known from Borneo.

References

Cereopsius
Beetles described in 1885